The Municipality of Šentjernej ( or) is a municipality in the traditional region of Lower Carniola in southeastern Slovenia.

Settlements
In addition to the municipal seat of Šentjernej, the municipality also includes the following settlements:

 Apnenik
 Breška Vas
 Brezje pri Šentjerneju
 Čadraže
 Cerov Log
 Čisti Breg
 Dobravica
 Dolenja Brezovica
 Dolenja Stara Vas
 Dolenje Gradišče pri Šentjerneju
 Dolenje Mokro Polje
 Dolenje Vrhpolje
 Dolenji Maharovec
 Drama
 Drča
 Gorenja Brezovica
 Gorenja Gomila
 Gorenja Stara Vas
 Gorenje Gradišče pri Šentjerneju
 Gorenje Mokro Polje
 Gorenje Vrhpolje
 Gorenji Maharovec
 Groblje pri Prekopi
 Gruča
 Hrastje
 Hrvaški Brod
 Imenje
 Javorovica
 Ledeča Vas
 Loka
 Mali Ban
 Mihovica
 Mihovo
 Mršeča Vas
 Orehovica
 Ostrog
 Polhovica
 Prapreče pri Šentjerneju
 Pristava pri Šentjerneju
 Pristavica
 Rakovnik
 Razdrto
 Roje
 Sela pri Šentjerneju
 Šentjakob
 Šmalčja Vas
 Šmarje
 Tolsti Vrh
 Veliki Ban
 Volčkova Vas
 Vratno
 Vrbovice
 Vrh pri Šentjerneju
 Zameško
 Zapuže
 Žerjavin
 Žvabovo

References

External links

Municipality of Šentjernej on Geopedia
Municipality of Šentjernej website

Sentjernej
1994 establishments in Slovenia